The Portuguese Beach Soccer League was a summer team sport event in Portugal. This was the result of an effort by the Portuguese District Football Associations of Algarve, Castelo Branco, Leiria, Lisboa, Porto and Setúbal, in cooperation with several local and national entities. 

The competition occurred between the months of May and July in four stages around the country. The biggest clubs that participated in this event were: Porto, Boavista, Benfica, Sporting CP and Vitória de Setúbal.

After 2010 this competition was exctint and replaced by Circuito Nacional de Futebol de Praia.

Winner

Performance by club

See also
 Circuito Nacional de Futebol de Praia

References

External links
FPF.pt 

Beach soccer in Portugal
Bea
National beach soccer leagues